Gilles Moretton (born 10 February 1958) is a former professional tennis player from France. He enjoyed most of his tennis success while playing doubles. During his career, he won four doubles titles. He achieved a career-high doubles ranking of world No. 55 in 1984.

Since 2001, he has been president of ASVEL Lyon-Villeurbanne, one of France's top basketball clubs.

In February 2021 he was elected president of the French Tennis Federation (FFT).

Career finals

Singles (1 runner-up)

Doubles (4 titles, 2 runner-ups)

References

External links
 
 
 

Basketball executives
French male tennis players
Living people
1958 births
Tennis players from Lyon